"Warriors" is a song by American pop rock band Imagine Dragons, used by Riot Games for a music video promoting the League of Legends 2014 World Championship. It was also included on the band's second studio album, Smoke + Mirrors. In addition, "Warriors" was used as the official theme song for the WWE 2015 Survivor Series. It is featured in The Divergent Series: Insurgent – Original Motion Picture Soundtrack, in the official trailer of USA Network's TV show Colony, and the final trailer for Wonder Woman. The song was released digitally as a single on September 18, 2014. The music video for the song was the most viewed League of Legends video online, with over 200 million views, until K/DA's Pop/Stars surpassed it in 2019. It was also the Official Song of the 2015 FIFA Women's World Cup in Canada. In early 2020, the song was used by Edda Hayes and 2WEI for the Season 2020 Cinematic of League of Legends. It has also been used in the Korean horror television series Sweet Home released in December 2020, almost 6 years after its original release.

Music video
The song premiered with the debut of its music video on the League of Legends YouTube channel on September 17, 2014. The song and its video served to promote the 2014 League of Legends World Championship.

Track listing

Chart performance

Weekly charts

Year-end charts

Certifications

References

2014 songs
2015 FIFA Women's World Cup
FIFA Women's World Cup official songs and anthems
Football songs and chants
Imagine Dragons songs
Interscope Records singles
League of Legends World Championship
Songs written by Alex da Kid
Songs written by Ben McKee
Songs written by Daniel Platzman
Songs written by Dan Reynolds (musician)